The Last Time I Saw Paris is a 1954 American Technicolor romantic drama made by Metro-Goldwyn-Mayer. It is loosely based on F. Scott Fitzgerald's short story "Babylon Revisited." It was directed by Richard Brooks, produced by Jack Cummings and filmed on locations in Paris and the MGM backlot. The screenplay was by Julius J. Epstein, Philip G. Epstein and Richard Brooks.

The film starred Elizabeth Taylor and Van Johnson in his last role for MGM, with Walter Pidgeon, Donna Reed, Eva Gabor,  Kurt Kasznar, George Dolenz, Sandy Descher, Odette, and (a then-unknown) Roger Moore in his Hollywood debut. The film's title song, by composer Jerome Kern and lyricist Oscar Hammerstein II, was already a classic when the movie was made and inspired the movie's title. Though the song had already won an Oscar after its film debut in 1941's Lady Be Good, it is featured much more prominently in The Last Time I Saw Paris. It can be heard in many scenes, either being sung by Odette or being played as an instrumental.

Plot
As World War II ends in Europe, Stars and Stripes journalist Charles Wills (Van Johnson) is on the streets of Paris, covering the celebrations. He suddenly is grabbed by a beautiful woman, who kisses him and disappears. Charles follows the crowd to Café Dhingo and meets another pretty woman named Marion Ellswirth (Donna Reed). The mutual attraction is instant, and she invites him to join her father's celebration of the end of the war in Europe. Charles, Marion and her persistent French suitor Claude Matine arrive at the Ellswirth household, and we find that the woman who had kissed Charles is Marion's younger sister Helen (Elizabeth Taylor).

Their father, James Ellswirth (Walter Pidgeon), had survived World War I and promptly joined the Lost Generation. Unlike most drifters, he never grew out of it, raising his two daughters to desire such a lifestyle. Helen takes after her father and uses her beauty to sustain a life of luxury even though they are flat broke. Marion goes the other way and looks for serious-minded and conventional young men such as Claude, an aspiring prosecutor, and Charles, the future novelist.

Charles and Helen start dating and fall in love. After Helen recovers from a near-death case of pneumonia, they get married and settle in Paris. James good-naturedly joins the happy family of Charles, with Helen eventually having a daughter, Vickie. Marion, having lost Charles to Helen, agrees to marry Claude. Charles struggles to make ends meet with his meager salary, unsuccessfully works on his novels and looks after Vickie.

At about this time, the barren oil fields in Texas that James had bought years before finally begin to produce. Charles, to whom James had given the oil fields as a dowry, quits his job, and Helen and James begin to host parties instead of going to them. Sudden wealth changes Helen, who becomes more responsible, and Charles parties his wealth away after quitting his newspaper job and having all his novels rejected by publishers. They also each start to pursue other interests: Helen flirts with handsome tennis player Paul Lane (Roger Moore), and Charles competes in a local Monte Carlo-to-Paris race with professional divorcee Lorraine Quarl.

After the race, Charles returns to Paris, only to find Helen sitting in Café Dhingo with Paul. A fight breaks out between Paul and Charles, and an angry Charles goes home first and puts the chain on the door, preventing it from being opened all the way. When Helen comes home and tries to enter she can't. She calls out to him, but Charles is in a drunken stupor on the staircase, and the bottle drops from his hands as Helen calls. Helen has to walk all the way to her sister's in the snow and rain. She catches pneumonia again and dies.

Marion petitions for and gets full custody of Vickie, and Charles returns home to America. A few years later, having straightened himself out, published a book, and stopped boozing, Charles returns to Paris, hoping his reform will persuade Marion to give Vickie back to him. Charles tells Marion that he only has one drink a day now. Marion refuses, still feeling resentful towards Charles' having fallen for Helen instead of her and for his being responsible for Helen's death. Seeing that Charles and Vickie belong together, Claude steps in and tells Marion that she is punishing Charles for his not realizing that Marion loved him, but marrying Helen instead, and the penalty for it is taking away the only thing he had left: his own daughter. Claude asks Marion to accept him and wanting their own child out of love and not out of defeat (as a result of Charles allowing Helen to die).

Marion goes into Café Dhingo (on whose main wall is a big picture of Helen) to look for Charles (who is gazing at the painting) and tells him that Helen would not have wanted him to be alone. Outside the cafe, Claude is with Vickie. The child runs to Charles, and Charles and the child walk away together.

Cast
Source: The New York Times

 Elizabeth Taylor as Helen Ellswirth
 Van Johnson as Charles Wills
 Walter Pidgeon as James Ellswirth
 Donna Reed as Marion Ellswirth
 Eva Gabor as Lorraine Quarl
 Kurt Kasznar as Maurice
 George Dolenz as Claude Matine
 Roger Moore as Paul
 Sandy Descher as Vicki
 Celia Lovsky as Mama
 Peter Leeds as Barney
 Dave Seville as Charlie
 John Doucette as Campbell
 Odette Myrtil as Singer
 Beatrice Miller as Grace (uncredited)
 Matt Moore as Englishman (uncredited)

Reception

At the time of the film's release, Variety called it an "engrossing romantic drama." According to  Bosley Crowther, "The story is trite. The motivations are thin. The writing is glossy and pedestrian. The acting is pretty much forced. Mr. Johnson as the husband is too bumptious when happy and too dreary when drunk; Miss Taylor as the wife is delectable, but she is also occasionally quite dull. Mr. Pidgeon is elaborately devilish, Sandra Descher as the child is over-cute, Donna Reed as the bitter sister is vapid and several others are in the same vein."

In 2011, The Time Out Film Guide said "Despite a very corny script from Julius and Philip Epstein which borrows clichés from Casablanca and countless "American in Paris" yarns, this remains an enjoyable (if heavy-handed) melodrama....Pidgeon steals the show as ... a penniless chancer who still manages to live the good life."

On the review aggregator website Rotten Tomatoes, 78% of 9 critics' reviews are positive, with an average rating of 6.3/10.

Box office
According to MGM records the film earned $2,635,000 in the U.S. and Canada and $2,305,000 elsewhere, resulting in a profit of $980,000.

Accolades
The film is recognized by American Film Institute in these lists:
 2002: AFI's 100 Years...100 Passions – Nominated

Copyright
The film was released in 1954; however, there was an error with the Roman numerals in the copyright notice showing "MCMXLIV" (1944), meaning the term of copyright started 10 years before the film was released. Thus, the normal 28-year copyright term ended just 18 years after the film was released, and MGM neglected to renew it presumably because they believed there was still 10 years left in the term. The film entered the public domain in the United States in 1972.

References

External links

 The Last Time I Saw Paris from Turner Classic Movies
 
 
 
 
 
 
 
 Turner Entertainment Co.

American romantic drama films
Films based on short fiction
Films directed by Richard Brooks
Metro-Goldwyn-Mayer films
Films shot in Monaco
Films about journalists
Films based on works by F. Scott Fitzgerald
Films set in Paris
Films set in 1945
1954 films
1954 romantic drama films
Films with screenplays by Philip G. Epstein
Films with screenplays by Julius J. Epstein
1950s English-language films
1950s American films